Messiha is a surname. Notable people with the surname include:

George Messiha (born 1982), Egyptian politician
Jean Messiha (born 1970), Egyptian-born French political advisor

See also
Messina (name)